Manniophyton is a genus of lianas of the spurge family (Euphorbiaceae) described as a genus in 1864. It contains only one known species, Manniophyton fulvum, native to tropical western and central Africa from Guinea to Angola. It is dioecious.

Formerly included
moved to Crotonogyne
 Manniophyton angustifolium - Crotonogyne parvifolia

References

Monotypic Euphorbiaceae genera
Flora of Africa
Aleuritideae
Dioecious plants